The Autostrada A30 is an Italian motorway which connects Caserta to Salerno.

The motorway connects motorway A1 (Milan-Naples) to motorway A2 (Salerno-Reggio Calabria), serving as a bypass of Naples and Salerno.

References

Buildings and structures completed in 1976
Autostrade in Italy
Transport in Campania